Martin Kupka (born 28 October 1975) is a Czech politician who has been a member of the Chamber of Deputies (MP) since 2017. He is currently serving as Minister of Transport in Petr Fiala's cabinet. He previously served as mayor of Líbeznice.

References

Notes 

1975 births
Living people
Civic Democratic Party (Czech Republic) mayors
Charles University alumni
Civic Democratic Party (Czech Republic) MPs
Members of the Chamber of Deputies of the Czech Republic (2017–2021)
Members of the Chamber of Deputies of the Czech Republic (2021–2025)
Civic Democratic Party (Czech Republic) Government ministers
Transport ministers of the Czech Republic
People from Jilemnice